Cyperus cephalanthus, commonly known as the buttonbush flatsedge, is a species of sedge that is native to southern parts of North America and South America.

See also
List of Cyperus species

References

cephalanthus
Plants described in 1836
Flora of Brazil
Flora of Argentina
Flora of Paraguay
Flora of Uruguay
Flora of Texas
Flora of Louisiana
Taxa named by John Torrey
Taxa named by William Jackson Hooker